Donat Prelvukaj, known professionally as Cricket, is a Kosovo-Albanian record producer.

Discography

Extended plays 
Nostalgji (2020)

Singles

As lead artist

Production credits

References 

21st-century Albanian musicians
Albanian record producers
Kosovo Albanians
Living people
2000 births